Oiartzun is a town and municipality located in the Basque Country, in the province of Gipuzkoa lying at the foot of the massif Aiako Harria (Peñas de Aya in Spanish).

Etymology

The name traces back to Oiasso or Oiarso, a Roman town closely connected to the Arditurri mines in the massif of Aiako Harria, which contained large amounts of silver and copper. However, it has been pinpointed to the current border town of Irun, so the name may have referred to the whole area.

Geography
A river bearing the same name meanders through the meadows and neighbourhoods of this sparse municipality. That is one of its main features, it is scattered in different quarters across the valley. Elizalde lies on a prominence and it is the central nucleus of the town, with the main church San Esteban and town hall being located there. At the foot of Elizalde lies Altzibar by the Oiartzun River. Ugaldetxo developed into an urban built-up area surrounded by industrial estates near the AP-8 motorway, while the rest of the neighbourhoods have hung onto their rural and picturesque landscape to a large extent.

Alfonso VIII of Castile chartered it as town but it took some decades before its independence from Orereta was total.

Sports
The town's football club, Oiartzun KE, plays at Karla Lekuona. The women's side has competed in the highest division of Spanish football, making Oiartzun one of the smallest towns in the country home to a top-flight club.

Notable people born in Oiartzun
 Sebastián Lartaún, Roman Catholic prelate who served as Bishop of Cuzco from 1570 to 1583
 Xabier Lete (1944–2010), writer, poet, singer and politician
 Izaskun Zubizarreta Guerendiain, (born 1970), ski mountaineer
 Juan María Lekuona (1927–2005), priest, poet and linguist
 Rafael Picavea y Leguía (1867–1946), industrialist, politician and journalist
 José Manuel Lasa (born 1940), cyclist
 Txomin Perurena (born 1943), cyclist
 Maixux Rekalde (1934-2022), pacifist, activist, journalist
 Miguel María Lasa (born 1948), cyclist
 Iker Leonet (born 1983), cyclist

Twin towns
Oiartzun is twinned with: 
  Carhaix, Brittany in France

References

External links
 Roman Museum of Oiasso (Basque, Spanish, English and French)
 Town Hall official site (Basque and Spanish)
 Guispuscoa Government site: Oiartzun (Basque and Spanish)
 OIARTZUN in the Bernardo Estornés Lasa - Auñamendi Encyclopedia (Euskomedia Fundazioa) Information available in Spanish

Municipalities in Gipuzkoa